Bryan John Dobzanski (born August 31, 1995) is an American baseball pitcher who is a free agent.

Amateur career
Dobzanski attended Delsea Regional High School in Franklinville, New Jersey, where he played baseball and wrestled. As a wrestler, he won two state titles and compiled a record of 155-8 for his high school career. In 2014, his senior year, he went 3–0 with a 0.91 ERA and 68 strikeouts over 46 innings.

Professional career
Dobzanski was selected by the St. Louis Cardinals in the 29th round of the 2014 Major League Baseball draft. He signed with the Cardinals, forgoing his commitment to play college baseball at the University of Louisville. He made his professional debut that year with the Rookie-level Gulf Coast League Cardinals, going 2–1 with a 2.67 ERA over 27 innings. In 2015, he pitched for the Johnson City Cardinals of the Rookie-level Appalachian League, compiling a 1–1 record and a 3.94 ERA over 16 innings, and in 2016, he played with the State College Spikes of the Class A Short Season New York–Penn League, going 4–6 with a 3.93 ERA over 14 games (13 starts), striking out 37 batters over 71 innings. In 2017, he spent the season with the Peoria Chiefs of the Class A Midwest League, going 2–5 with a 3.70 ERA over 31 games (12 starts); he was moved from the starting rotation to the bullpen midway through the year. He began the 2018 season back with Peoria (with whom he was named an All-Star) before being promoted to the Palm Beach Cardinals of the Class A-Advanced Florida State League in July. Over 42 relief appearances between the two clubs, he compiled an 8–4 record with a 2.41 ERA. In 2019, he split time with Palm Beach (earning Florida State League All-Star honors), the Springfield Cardinals of the Class AA Texas League, and the Memphis Redbirds of the Class AAA Pacific Coast League; over 57 relief innings pitched between the three teams, he went 3–3 with a 2.84 ERA and 66 strikeouts.

Dobzanski did not play a minor league game in 2020 due to the cancellation of the minor league season caused by the COVID-19 pandemic. On November 2, 2020, he elected free agency. On January 12, 2021, he signed a minor league contract with the Washington Nationals organization. For the 2021 season, he was assigned to the Harrisburg Senators of the Double-A Northeast with whom he went 1-1 with a 3.47 ERA and 46 strikeouts over  innings. He elected free agency on November 7, 2021.

References

External links

1995 births
Living people
Baseball players from New Jersey
Baseball pitchers
Minor league baseball players
Gulf Coast Cardinals players
Johnson City Cardinals players
State College Spikes players
Peoria Chiefs players
Palm Beach Cardinals players
Springfield Cardinals players
Memphis Redbirds players
Harrisburg Senators players
People from Franklin Township, Gloucester County, New Jersey
Sportspeople from Gloucester County, New Jersey